Jeffrey A. Gibson (born 1972) is an American Mississippi Choctaw/Cherokee painter, and sculptor. He has lived and worked in Brooklyn; Hudson, New York; and Germantown, New York.

Early life and education 
Jeffrey A. Gibson was born on March 31, 1972 in Colorado Springs, Colorado. As a child his family moved frequently because his father worked for the United States Department of Defense. As a youth he lived in North Carolina, New Jersey, West Germany, and South Korea.

Gibson earned his Bachelor of Fine Arts degree in 1995 from the School of the Art Institute of Chicago. In 1998 he received his Master of Fine Arts from the Royal College of Art, sponsored by the Mississippi Band of Choctaw Indians. Gibson remarked on this opportunity provided for him: "My community has supported me ... My chief felt that me going there, being a strong artist, made him stronger."

Gibson has identified as queer and gay. He is married to Norwegian artist Rune Olsen, and together they have a daughter.

Career

Gibson was an artist in residence at Bard College, where he also teaches in studio art courses. In 2010 he was a visiting artist at the California College of the Arts.

In order to keep regular studio hours, Gibson prefers to work between the hours of 10 am and 6 pm. His computer, cell phone, and a movie are generally at his reach if a break is needed while working. Music usually plays in the background, sometimes random, sometimes a specific record with genres ranging from African funk, jazz, punk, pop music, rap, R&B, disco, as well as East Indian drumming.

Gibson's art deals with issues of identity and labels. His work has featured the use of mixed media including Native American beadwork, trading post blankets, metal studs, fringe, and jingles. Airbrushing is another common tool used in his paintings, sculptures, and prints, incorporating oil paint and spray paint to create neon colored abstracts such as Singular (2008) and Submerge (2007). These works also find inspiration in graffiti, reflective of Gibson's urban life in New York City.

Influences
Gibson draws influence in materials, processes, media, and iconographies. He has found inspiration in events that revolve around dancing, specifically from Leigh Bowery and his dramatic nightclub persona. Pow-wows, nightclubs, and raves provide contrasts as rural and urban venues, serving as spaces for dancing, movement, and dramatic fashion/regalia. Keeping with regalia, 19th-century Iroquois beadwork also provides inspiration, as colorful beads often find their way into Gibson's artworks. Gibson also provides his own spin on graffiti, which is seen frequently in his works.

He also credits his nomadic lifestyle as a major influence, bringing together what he describes as:
... varying aesthetics of each place. Some have had specific cultural aesthetics, language barriers, cultural barriers, etcetera. These differences funnel through me, a queer Native male born toward the end of the 20th century and entering the 21st century. I consider this hybrid in the construction of my work and attempt to show that complexity.

Artworks

Rawhide painting series
Gibson's practice has involved painting in oil and acrylic on rawhide-clad wood panels. He is recycling found objects such as antique shaving mirrors and ironing boards and covers them in untanned deer, goat, or elk skin. Gibson combines domestic, Native American, and Hard-edge modernist references. His punching bag made from found Everlast punching bags, U.S. Army wool blankets, glass beads, tin jingles, and the artist's repurposed paintings exemplify the dialogue between mainstream pop culture and Native American powwow aesthetics.

His work Document, 2015 (2015) is made with acrylic and graphite on deer rawhide, hung with steel spikes. Under Cover (2015) was a made with rawhide stretched over wood panel.

"Atmospheric landscapes"
Before that Gibson's most notable works, his at times 3-D wall abstracts, have been described as "atmospheric landscapes". Working in oil paint he also brings together objects that have become a signature to his works: pigmented silicon, urethane foam, and beads.

Alive (2017)
Alive showed as part of the Desert x exhibition in the Coachella Valley from February 25 to April 30, 2017

Totems series
Creating his own totem sculptures, in 2009 Gibson produced the Totems series for an exhibition at Sala Diaz in San Antonio, Texas. This series of sculptures involved Gibson arriving five days before the opening to put together a collection of found objects to create what have been described, by the artist, as "fantasy  s e x  partners, objects of desire".

The Totems feature objects such as mannequins acquired from Craigslist, a wig, plastic flowers, toys, cowboy boots, flower pots, his signature spray paint and other objects. In the end Gibson created two human-like figures and a totem pole from the flower pots. Writer Ben Judson described Totems as way Gibson "uses the stereotyping of his own people as a way of exploring the use of metaphor in identity formation, cultural critique and consumerism without forfeiting lyricism or indulging in self-righteousness (apart, that is, from his press release)."

Reception
Gibson's abstract works have been compared to artists such as Martin Johnson Heade, Cy Twombly, Chris Ofili, and Indigenous Australian art. Artist and poet Jimmie Durham declared that Gibson "might be our Miles Davis", our referring to Native America. While some celebrate him as a Native artist, others celebrate his ability to move freely in and out of Native and non-Native contemporary art worlds.

Notable collections
 Crystal Bridges Museum
 Denver Art Museum
 Hood Museum
 Nasher Museum of Art
 Nerman Museum of Contemporary Art
 Mississippi Museum of Art
 Museum of Fine Arts, Boston
 Eiteljorg Museum of American Indians and Western Art
 Philbrook Museum of Art
 Smithsonian Institution, National Museum of the American Indian
 School for Advanced Research
 Speed Art Museum
 Whitney Museum of American Art

Notable exhibitions

 This Burning World, 2022, solo exhibition, Institute of Contemporary Art San Francisco, San Francisco, California
 Stretching the Canvas: Eight Decades of Native Painting (2019–2021), National Museum of the American Indian George Gustav Heye Center, New York, New York
Jeffrey Gibson: This Is the Day, 2018–19, Ruth and Elmer Wellin Museum of Art at Hamilton College, Clinton, New York, Blanton Museum of Art, Austin, Texas
 Jeffrey Gibson: Like A Hammer, 2018–19, Denver Art Museum, Denver, CO, Mississippi Museum of Art, Jackson, MS, Seattle Art Museum, Seattle, WA, Madison Museum of Contemporary Art, Madison, WI
 Sakahan, 2013, National Gallery of Canada, Ottawa, Ontario
 Said The Pigeon to the Squirrel, 2013, National Academy Museum and School, New York, NY
 Love Song, 2013, Institute of Contemporary Art, Boston, MA
 Tipi Poles Performing As Lines, 2013, Cornell Fine Arts Museum, Winter Park, FL
 Marc Straus, 2012, New York, NY
 Shapeshifting, 2012, Peabody Essex Museum, Salem, MA
 Changing Hands 3, 2012, Museum of Arts and Design, New York, NY
 Recent Acquisitions, 2011, Denver Art Museum, Denver, CO
 Recent Acquisitions, 2011, Museum of Fine Arts, Boston, Boston, MA
 Collision, 2010, Rhode Island School of Design, Providence, RI
 Vantage Point, 2010, National Museum of the American Indian, Washington, DC
 Flushing Town Hall Projects, 2008, Flushing Town Hall, New York, NY
 Group show, 2008, Kentler International Drawing Space, Brooklyn, NY
 Voices From the Mound, 2008, IAIA Museum of Contemporary Arts, Santa Fe, NM
 Group show, 2007, New England School of Art and Design, Boston, MA
 Off the Map, 2007, National Museum of the American Indian, New York, NY
 SONOTUBE, 2007, Santa Barbara Contemporary Arts, Santa Barbara, CA
 BROOKLYN, 2006, Westport Arts Center, Westport, CT
 No Reservations, 2006, Aldrich Contemporary Art Museum, Ridgefield, CT
 Paumanok-a, 2006, Stony Brook University, Stony Brook, NY
 Tropicalisms, 2006, Jersey City Museum, Jersey City, NJ
 Indigenous Anomaly, 2005, American Indian Community House, New York, NY
 (re)positions, 2001, Bronx Museum of the Arts, New York, NY

Gibson has also exhibited at numerous events such as the New Art Dealers Alliance Fair, ARCOmadrid, as well as many private galleries and public institutions.

Notable awards and grants
MacArthur Fellowship, 2019
Joan Mitchell Foundation Painters and Sculptors Grant, 2012
 TED (conference) Foundation Fellow, 2012
 Smithsonian Institution Contemporary Arts Grant, 2012
 Jerome Hill Foundation, 2012
 Eiteljorg Museum Fellowship for Native American Fine Art, 2009, Eiteljorg Museum of American Indians and Western Art
 Ronald & Susan Dubin Fellowship, 2008, School for Advanced Research

References

External links
 Gibson's work exhibited in Off the Map from the National Museum of the American Indian
Jeffrey Gibson at Roberts Projects, Los Angeles, CA
 Jeffrey Gibson: Indigenous Anomaly, exhibition at the American Indian Community House Gallery, 2005
 Jeffrey Gibson: Totems, Gibson's blog from the Sala Diaz show

1972 births
Alumni of the Royal College of Art
American contemporary painters
Painters from New York City
Mississippi Band Choctaw people
Choctaw people of Cherokee descent
Contemporary sculptors
American gay artists
Living people
Native American installation artists
Native American male artists
Native American painters
Native American printmakers
Native American sculptors
Painters from Colorado
School of the Art Institute of Chicago alumni
20th-century American sculptors
20th-century American male artists
American male sculptors
20th-century American painters
American male painters
20th-century American printmakers
Sculptors from New York (state)
Sculptors from Colorado
Native American people from Colorado
LGBT Native Americans
LGBT people from Colorado
21st-century American male artists
21st-century American painters
21st-century American sculptors
20th-century Native Americans
21st-century Native Americans